ISCOR may refer to:
 Mittal Steel South Africa, formerly known as ISCOR
 The Institute for International Security and Conflict Resolution at San Diego State University in San Diego, California